The men's 200 metre breaststroke event at the 2016 Summer Olympics took place between 9–10 August at the Olympic Aquatics Stadium.

Summary
Double Asian Games champion Dmitriy Balandin surprised the field from the outside to become Kazakhstan's first ever gold medalist in swimming. Coming from behind in lane eight, he produced a late surge about the midway of the final leg to upset the pool for an unexpected Olympic triumph with a 2:07.46. U.S. breaststroker Josh Prenot nearly charged to the front at the final stretch, before fading to a runner-up finish in 2:07.53, seven-hundredths of a second behind the Kazakh. Meanwhile, Russia's Anton Chupkov claimed the final podium spot, putting up a time of 2:07.70.

Great Britain's Andrew Willis improved upon his eighth-place feat from London 2012 to finish fourth with a 2:07.78, narrowly missing on a podium by eight-hundredths of a second. Japan's Yasuhiro Koseki seized a comfortable lead throughout the majority of the race but slipped down the order on the home stretch to finish fifth in 2:07.80. Koseki's teammate Ippei Watanabe posted a sixth-place time in 2:07.87, while defending World Champion Marco Koch of Germany (2:08.00) and Prenot's fellow countryman Kevin Cordes (2:08.34) rounded out the top eight.

Earlier in the semifinals, Watanabe threw down a top-seeded time of 2:07.22 to slice 0.06 seconds off the existing Olympic record set by Hungary's defending champion Dániel Gyurta, who had narrowly missed the top sixteen field in the heats.

Records
Prior to this competition, the existing world and Olympic records were as follows.

The following records were established during the competition:

Competition format

The competition consisted of three rounds: heats, semifinals, and a final. The swimmers with the best 16 times in the heats advanced to the semifinals. The swimmers with the best 8 times in the semifinals advanced to the final. Swim-offs were used as necessary to break ties for advancement to the next round.

Results

Heats

Semifinals

Semifinal 1

Semifinal 2

Final

References

Men's 00200 metre breaststroke
Olympics
Men's events at the 2016 Summer Olympics